ALK Airlines, legally incorporated as Air Lubo (ALK JSC), is a Bulgarian passenger charter airline headquartered in Sofia.

History
The airline commenced operations in mid-2016 and originally planned to take over two pre-owned Fokker 100 from defunct Dutch Antilles Express. However only one of them was subsequently operated while the other was sold for spare parts to Iran Aseman Airlines.

Destinations
The airline offers worldwide charter flights with a focus on services to and from Bulgaria.

Fleet

Current fleet
ALK Airlines operates the following aircraft as of December 2022:

 2 Boeing-737-300
 2 McDonnell Douglas MD-82

Historic fleet
The airline formerly also operated the following aircraft types, however both of them only briefly:
 4 Fokker 100
 1 McDonnell Douglas MD-83

Incidents and accidents
 On 17 June 2019, an ALK Airlines Boeing 737-300 performing flight VBB-7205 from Pristina, Kosovo to Basel, Switzerland hit severe turbulence at approximately 32,000 feet which threw passengers, service items and flight attendants into the ceiling of the jet causing injuries. The experience has been reported to have been similar to that of Zero G. 10 passengers were taken to the hospital after landing.

References

External links

Official website

Airlines of Bulgaria
Airlines established in 2016
Bulgarian companies established in 2016